Nicholas John Halstead (born 9 April 1972 in Kent) is a British racing driver, software engineer and entrepreneur set to compete in the 2023 British Touring Car Championship, driving for Bristol Street Motors with EXCELR8 TradePriceCars.com. Halstead has previously competed in British GT and the Ginetta GT4 Supercup. He won the AM title in the 2018 Ginetta GT5 Challenge, and made his British Touring Car Championship debut at Croft in 2021, substituting for Rick Parfitt Jr. at Excelr8 with TradePriceCars.com.

Halstead is the founder of companies such as Infosum, Datasift and TweetMeme, the latter of which was the first site containing the retweet feature, before it was sold to Twitter in 2010.

Career

Fav.or.it
In October 2007, the Fav.or.it company was founded, a proposed blog commenting system founded on principle that consumers and businesses both need content curated. The site was launched in 2008, and quickly built to 500,000 monthly users.

TweetMeme
In January 2008, the first prototype of TweetMeme was released, a site founded by Nick which tracked trending topics on the social media giant Twitter. The site would find new topics being talked about, and would track numbers talking about them to rank them, an aggregator. The full site was then launched to the public in July the same year.

In February 2009 the retweet button was released onto the website, a feature allowing you to share posts you liked. Although this feature was founded on the TweetMeme website, it soon became a standard feature of almost all forum and social media sites, with approximately 1.6 billion retweet buttons across different pages on the internet.

On 12 August 2010 the retweet feature was sold to Twitter, and the website was shut down in September 2012, when it still had 3 million users at the time.

DataSift
Halstead announced DataSift in September 2010 at the TechCrunch Disrupt conference, a social data platform that provides brands and enterprises with access to content from the likes of Facebook, Twitter, Tumblr and dozens of other social networks. The software was officially released in November 2011.

Nick stepped down as CEO of the company in October 2015.

InfoSum
In late 2015 Halstead founded Cognitive Logic, a data collaboration company. It was rebranded to InfoSum in September 2017.

Racing career

Ginetta GT5 Challenge
In 2017 Halstead would make his professional racing debut in the Ginetta GT5 Challenge with Fox Motorsport. Competing in the AM class, in this year he would pick up ten podiums in the class to finish 3rd in the AM standings.

He would continue with Fox Motorsport in the AM class in 2018, where with four in-class victories he would go on to win the AM title.

In 2019 he made the switch to the Pro class, still competing with Fox Motorsport, where he had a best finish of 11th.

Ginetta GT4 Supercup
Competing in a handful of races in series such as TCR UK and the Renault Clio Cup UK alongside his Ginetta GT5 campaign across 2019, in 2020 Nick would step up to the Ginetta GT4 Supercup, competing in the Pro-AM class still with Fox Motorsport. Across this season in his class he racked up 3 wins, 15 podiums, 3 pole positions and 4 fastest laps on his way to 3rd in the championship standings.

With Fox Motorsport, he would compete in the rounds at Oulton Park and Brands Hatch in 2021 in the Pro-AM class, scoring a second place finish at Brands Hatch.

He continued in the championship with Fox Motorsport in 2022 in the G55 Pro class alongside his British GT campaign.

British GT
Nick made his British GT debut in 2021, racing a McLaren 570S in the GT4 Pro-AM class alongside teammate Jamie Stanley. The duo achieved 2 wins in class over the course of 7 races to finish 2nd in the GT4 Pro-AM cup and tied 8th overall in the GT4 category.

Halstead continued with Fox Motorsport in the series in 2022, this time switching to the GT3 category.

British Touring Car Championship
Halstead made his British Touring Car Championship debut at Croft in 2021, substituting for Rick Parfitt Jr. at Excelr8 with TradePriceCars.com. Over the course of the weekend Halstead finished in a better position every race, driving home to 21st position in Race 3.

Racing record

Racing career summary

Complete British GT Championship results
(key) (Races in bold indicate pole position) (Races in italics indicate fastest lap)

Complete British Touring Car Championship results
(key) Races in bold indicate pole position (1 point awarded – 2002–2003 all races, 2004–present just in first race) Races in italics indicate fastest lap (1 point awarded all races) * signifies that driver lead race for at least one lap (1 point awarded – 2002 just in feature races, 2003–present all races)

Complete Asian Le Mans Series results
(key) (Races in bold indicate pole position) (Races in italics indicate fastest lap)

References

External links
 
 

British racing drivers
English racing drivers
People from Kent
1972 births
Living people
British Touring Car Championship drivers
Ginetta GT4 Supercup drivers
British GT Championship drivers
Asian Le Mans Series drivers